Divine Public School, Rayagada is a Co-ed public High school in Rayagada. It is situated at the By-pass road of Rayagada opposite to UGMIT, Rayagada.

History 
Divine Group of Schools are the institutions of educational and extra-curricular excellence. Its objective is to make holistic development of each child.
 
Established in the year 1993, the school was recognized by the Government of Orissa, Education Department. Hindi is the second language in this English medium school. The school is affiliated with Indian Certificate of Secondary Education ICSE syllabus. The school has a spacious and well resourced Library.

Campus & Buildings
The school is located on the bypass road of Rayagada.

See also
 Official website of Rayagada

References 

Schools in Odisha
Education in Rayagada district
Educational institutions established in 1993
1993 establishments in Orissa